The following list of New Jersey cemeteries lists cemeteries in the U.S. state of New Jersey. The cemeteries are grouped by county.

Atlantic County
Atlantic City Cemetery, Pleasantville
Atlantic County Veterans Cemetery, Estell Manor
Holy Cross Cemetery and Chapel Mausoleum, Mays Landing
Lincoln Memorial Park, Mays Landing
Laurel Memorial Park and Crematory, Pomona
Head Of The River Cemetery, 600 NJ Route-49, Estell Manor

Bergen County

Americus Cemetery, Saddle Brook
B'Nai Israel Cemetery, Saddle Brook
Brookside Cemetery, Englewood 
Cedar Park and Beth El Cemetery, Emerson
Cemetery of the Madonna, Leonia
Christ the King Cemetery, Franklin Lakes
Edgewater Cemetery (also known as Vreeland Cemetery), Edgewater
Fairview Cemetery, Fairview
French Burial Ground, Hackensack
First Reformed Dutch Church, Hackensack
George Washington Memorial Park (Paramus, New Jersey)
Gethsemane Cemetery, Little Ferry
Hackensack Cemetery, Hackensack 
Hillside Cemetery, Lyndhurst 
Holy Cross Cemetery, North Arlington
Lodi Burial Grounds, Hackensack
Maple Grove Park Cemetery, Hackensack
Mount Carmel Cemetery, Tenafly
Mount Moriah Cemetery, Fairview
Mountain Cemetery, Ramsey
North Arlington Jewish Cemetery
Old Hook Cemetery (now Westwood Cemetery), Westwood
Pascack Cemetery, Park Ridge
Riverside Cemetery, Saddle Brook
Saint Andrews Cemetery, Hackensack
Saint Francis de Sales Cemetery, Lodi
Saint Joseph Cemetery, Hackensack 
Saint Luke's Cemetery, Park Ridge
Saint Mary's Cemetery, Hackensack 
SS Peter and Paul Cemetery, Hackensack
Valleau Cemetery, Ridgewood
Westwood Cemetery, Hackensack
Woodside Cemetery, Dumont
Woodside Cemetery, Hackensack
Wyckoff Reformed Church Cemetery, Wyckoff

Burlington County

Arney's Mount Friends Meetinghouse and Burial Ground, Springfield Township
Beverly National Cemetery, Beverly
Lakeview Memorial Park, Cinnaminson Township
Mount Holly Cemetery, Mount Holly
 Mount Moriah Cemetery, Hainesport Township
 Miller Cemetery, New Gretna
 Old Upper Springfield Friends Burying Ground, Springfield Township and Wrightstown
St. Mary's Episcopal Church, Burlington, New Jersey
 St. Peter's Cemetery, Jesus the Good Shepherd Parish, Riverside

Camden County

Arlington Cemetery, Pennsauken
Colestown Cemetery, Cherry Hill Township
Harleigh Cemetery, Camden and Collingswood 
Locustwood Memorial Park, Cherry Hill Township

Cape May County
Cape May County Veterans Memorial Park and Cemetery, 129 Crest Haven Road, Cape May Court House
Cold Spring Presbyterian Cemetery, 780 Seashore Road, Cold Spring
Seaside Cemetery Co, 559 Route US 9 S, Marmora

Cumberland County
Old Broad Street Presbyterian Church and Cemetery, Bridgeton
Siloam Cemetery, Vineland
Mount Pleasant Cemetery, Millville
Greenwood Memorial Park, Millville
Holy Cross Cemetery, Millville
Sacred Heart Cemetery, Vineland
Cumberland County Veterans Cemetery, Hopewell Township

Essex County
Bloomfield Cemetery, Bloomfield
Christ Church Cemetery & Mausoleum, Belleville
Clinton Cemetery
Fairmount Cemetery, Newark
Franklin Reformed Church Cemetery, Nutley
Glendale Cemetery, Bloomfield 
Holy Sepulchre Cemetery, East Orange
St. Mary's Cemetery, East Orange
Immaculate Conception Cemetery, Montclair
Mount Hebron Cemetery, Montclair
Mount Olivet Cemetery, Newark
Mount Pleasant Cemetery, Newark
Old First Presbyterian Church (Newark, New Jersey)
Rosedale Cemetery, Orange 
Saint Stephen's Cemetery & The Chapel at Short Hills, Short Hills
St. Johns Catholic Cemetery, Orange
Woodland Cemetery, Newark, New Jersey
Brookdale Reformed Church, Bloomfield.
Belleville Reformed Church (now under a new name), Belleville.

Gloucester County
Eglington Cemetery, Clarksboro
Trinity Church (Swedesboro, New Jersey)

Hudson County

Hunterdon County
 Allerton Methodist Cemetery, Annandale
 Amwell Ridge Cemetery, Ringoes
 Baptistown Cemetery, Baptistown
 Barber Burying Ground, Sandy Ridge
 Bethlehem Cemetery, Union Township (Grandin)
 Bethlehem Baptist Cemetery, Pattenburg
  Bethlehem Presbyterian Churchyard, Union Township (Grandin)
 Bloomsbury Methodist Churchyard, Bloomsbury
 Bloomsbury Presbyterian Churchyard, Bloomsbury
 Central Baptist Church Cemetery, Hampton
 Cherryville Mountainview Cemetery, Flemington
 Clinton Baptist Church Cemetery, Clinton
 Clinton Presbyterian Churchyard, Clinton
 Clover Hill Reformed Church Cemetery, Clover Hill
 Cokesbury Presbyterian Church Cemetery, Cokesbury
 Cokesbury United Methodist Church Cemetery, Cokesbury
 Evergreen Cemetery, Clinton
 Everittstown Methodist Cemetery, Everittstown
 Fairmount Cemetery, Fairmount
 Fairmount Presbyterian Cemetery, Fairmount
 Fairmount Methodist Churchyard, Fairmount
 First Presbyterian Church Cemetery, Lambertville
 Flemington Baptist Churchyard, Flemington
 Flemington Jewish Community Cemetery, Flemington
 Flemington Presbyterian Church Cemetery, Flemington
 Fountain Grove Cemetery, Glen Gardner
 Frenchtown Cemetery, Frenchtown
 Friends Cemetery, Pittstown
 Holcombe Riverview Cemetery, Lambertville
 Holland Presbyterian Church Cemetery, Holland
 Immaculate Conception Cemetery and Mausoleum, Annandale
 Locktown Christian Cemetery, Locktown
 Locust Grove Cemetery, Quakertown
 Lower Amwell Cemetery – New Yard, Sergeantsville
 Lower Amwell Cemetery – Old Yard, Sergeantsville
 Lower Valley Union Cemetery, Califon
 Memorial Park Cemetery, Whitehouse
 Methodist Episcopal Church Cemetery, Kingwood
 Milford Christian Churchyard, Milford
  Milford Union Cemetery, Milford
 Mount Hope Cemetery, Lambertville
 Mount Pleasant Cemetery, Mount Pleasant
 Mountain View Cemetery, Cokesbury
 Musconetcong Valley Cemetery, Hampton
 New Germantown Cemetery, Oldwick
 New Lebanon Reformed Church Cemetery, Lebanon
 Newell Cemetery, Stanton
 Nixon Cemetery, Quakertown
 Norton Cemetery, Norton
 Norton Methodist Episcopal Cemetery, Norton
 Oak Summit Cemetery, Kingwood
 Old Lebanon Reformed Church Cemetery, Lebanon
 Old Saint Mary Cemetery, Clinton
 Old School Baptist Cemetery, Locktown
 Oldwick Methodist Cemetery, Oldwick
 Pattenburg United Methodist Church Cemetery, Pattenburg
 Philhower Family Burying Ground, Lebanon
 Pleasant Ridge Cemetery, Ringoes
 Prallsville Cemetery, Stockton 
 Prospect Hill Cemetery, Flemington
 Readington Reformed Church Cemetery, Readington
 Riverside Cemetery, Clinton
 Rocks Methodist Episcopal Cemetery, Mount Airy
 Rosemont Cemetery, Rosemont
 Rural Hill Cemetery, Whitehouse
 Saint Ann’s Catholic Church Cemetery, Hampton
 Saint John the Evangelist Cemetery, Lambertville
 Saint Magdalen Cemetery, Flemington
 Saint Thomas Episcopal Church Cemetery, Pittstown
 Sand Brook German Baptist Church Cemetery, Sand Brook
 Sandy Ridge Cemetery, Sandy Ridge
 Second English Presbyterian Church Cemetery, Amwell
 Sergeantsville Methodist Episcopal Church Cemetery, Sergeantsville
 Slacktown Cemetery, Kingwood
 Spruce Run Cemetery, Spruce Run
 Stout-Manners Cemetery, Ringoes
 Three Bridges Reformed Church Cemetery, Three Bridges
 Union Cemetery, Grandin
 Union Cemetery, Lebanon
 Union Cemetery, Ringoes
 United Methodist Cemetery, Whitehouse
 Wertsville Baptist Churchyard, Ringoes
 Woodschurch Cemetery, Readington
 Zion Lutheran Church Cemetery, Oldwick

Mercer County
Ewing Church Cemetery & Mausoleum, Ewing
Friends Burying Ground, Trenton
Greenwood Cemetery, Hamilton Township
Groveville Methodist Church Cemetery, Groveville, Hamilton Township
Cemeteries in Robbinsville, NJ  Princeton 
Princeton Cemetery, Princeton 
Riverview Cemetery, Trenton
Saint Mary's Cemetery, Trenton
Stony Brook Meeting House and Cemetery, Princeton

Middlesex County
 Alpine Cemetery, Perth Amboy
 Chestnut Hill Cemetery, Old Bridge, East Brunswick
 Christ Church Cemetery, South Amboy
 Christ Church, New Brunswick, New Jersey
 Elm Ridge Cemetery, North Brunswick
 Elmwood Cemetery, North Brunswick
 First Presbyterian Churchyard, New Brunswick
 First Presbyterian Church and Cemetery, Woodbridge,
 First Reformed Church Cemetery, New Brunswick
Frost Woods Memorial Park, East Brunswick
 Harris Hebrew Cemetery, New Market Road, South Plainfield
 Holy Cross Burial Park, South Brunswick
 Holy Redeemer Cemetery, South Clinton Avenue, South Plainfield
 Lake Nelson Memorial Park, Randolphville Road, Piscataway
Liberty Grove Memorial Mausoleum & Crematory, Old Bridge
 Loew's Cemetery, New Brunswick
 Mount Lebanon Memorial Park, Iselin
 Resurrection Cemetery, Hoes Lane, Piscataway
 St. Peter's Cemetery, New Brunswick
 Seventh Day Baptist Cemetery, Stelton Road, Piscataway
 Stelton Baptist Church, Edison
 Three Mile Run Cemetery, New Brunswick
 Trinity Episcopal Church, Woodbridge
 Van Liew Cemetery, North Brunswick
 Willow Grove Cemetery, New Brunswick

Monmouth County
 Presbyterian Cemetery, Allentown
 Shoreland Memorial Gardens, Hazlet
Aumack Family Burying Ground, Hazlet
 Maplewood Cemetery, Freehold Township
Locust Grove Cemetery, Eatontown
 Glenwood Cemetery, West Long Branch
Green Grove Cemetery, Keyport
Holmdel Cemetery & Mausoleum, Holmdel
Woodbine Cemetery, Oceanport
 St. John's Cemetery, Allentown
 Monmouth Memorial Park Cemetery, Tinton Falls
 Cream Ridge Cemetery, Upper Freehold
 Emley Hill Cemetery, Emleys Hill
 St. Rose of Lima, Freehold
 Old Scots Burying Ground, Marlboro Township
 Old Tennent Cemetery, Manalapan Township
 Farmingdale Evergreen Cemetery, Farmingdale
 Adelphia Cemetery, Adelphia
 Cedar Lawn Cemetery, Howell
 St. Vladimir's Russian Orthodox Cemetery, Jackson
 Ardena Baptist Church Cemetery, Ardena
 St. Anne's Cemetery, Wall Township
 Atlantic Cemetery, Colts Neck
 Atlantic View Cemetery & Mausoleum, Manasquan
 St. Catharine's Cemetery, Sea Girt
 St. Gabriel's Cemetery, Marlboro
 White Ridge Cemetery, Eatontown
 Yellow Meeting House Cemetery, Red Valley

Morris County
Chester Cemetery, Chester
Evergreen Cemetery, Morristown
Fair Mount Cemetery, Chatham
Gate of Heaven Cemetery, East Hanover, New Jersey 
German Valley Rural Cemetery, Long Valley
Greenwood Cemetery, Boonton
Hilltop Presbyterian Cemetery, Mendham
Our Lady of the Mountain Cemetery, Schooley's Mountain
Pleasant Hill Cemetery, Chester
Presbyterian Church Cemetery, Morristown
Restland Memorial Park, East Hanover
Rev. John Hancock House, Cider Mill and Cemetery - Florham Park NPS gallery
St. Joseph's Catholic Church Cemetery, Mendham
Union Cemetery, Washington Township

Ocean County
Miller Cemetery, New Gretna
Zion United Methodist Cemetery, Plumsted
White Cedars Memorial Park, Stafford
Whiting Memorial Park & Mausoleum, Whiting

Passaic County
Cedar Lawn Cemetery, Paterson
Immaculate Conception Cemetery, Clifton
Laurel Grove Memorial Park, Totowa

Salem County
Finn's Point National Cemetery, Salem
St. John's Episcopal Cemetery, Salem

Somerset County
 Abraham Stryker Burying Ground, Skillman
 Adamsville Cemetery (see Mountain Top Cemetery, below)
 Basking Ridge Cemetery, Basking Ridge
 Bedminster Reformed Church Cemetery, Bedminster
 Beekman Cemetery, Rocky Hill
 Bernardsville Methodist Cemetery, Bernardsville 
 Bishop Janes Cemetery, Bernardsville 
 Blau-Nevius Burying Ground, Skillman 
 Blawenburg Reformed Church Cemetery, Blawenburg
 Bolmer Family Burying Ground, Martinsville 
 Bound Brook Mountain Avenue Cemetery, Bound Brook 
 Brokaw-Polhameus Family Burying Ground, South Bound Brook 
 Brook Avenue Presbyterian Cemetery, North Plainfield 
 Castner-Compton Cemetery, Martinsville 
 Cedar Grove Cemetery, Franklin Township
 Cedar Hill Cemetery, East Millstone 
 Clover Hill Reformed Church Cemetery, Hillsborough 
 Coddington-Van Tuyl Cemetery, Warren 
 Covenhoven Family Burying Ground, Franklin Township 
 Davis Burial Ground, Zarephath
 Dumont Burying Ground, Hillsborough Township 
 Dutchtown Cemetery (see Unionville Cemetery, below)
 Early Settlers Burial Ground, Somerville
 Eldert Smith-Bennett Burial Ground, Franklin Township
 Evergreen Cemetery, Basking Ridge
 First Reformed Dutch Church, Somerville 
 Fisher Family Graveyard, South Bound Brook
 Flagtown Cemetery, Raritan 
 Gladstone Methodist Cemetery (see Peapack Union Cemetery, below)
 Grand View Cemetery (see Mountain Top Cemetery, below) 
 Griggstown Cemetery, Franklin Township
 Hall Cemetery, Neshanic Station 
 Harlingen Reform Cemetery, Rocky Hill 
 Hill Cemetery, Monmouth Junction 
 Hillsborough Reformed Church and Millstone Cemetery, Hillsborough
 Hoagland Cemetery, Raritan
 Hofheimer Cemetery, Plainfield 
 Holy Cross Cemetery, Basking Ridge 
 Holy Ghost Carpatho-Russian Orthodox Cemetery, Manville 
 Immaculate Conception Cemetery, Somerville
 Jerolaman Cemetery, Peapack-Gladstone
 Kingston Presbyterian Church Cemetery, Kingston
 Lamington Black Cemetery, an African American cemetery
 Lamington Presbyterian Church Cemetery, Bedminster
 Liberty Corner Presbyterian Church Cemetery, Liberty Corner
 Mill Lane Cemetery, Flagtown 
 Millington Baptist Church Cemetery, Millington
 Mount Bethel Cemetery, Warren 
 Mount Horeb United Methodist Cemetery, Warren
 Mountain Top Cemetery, Somerville 
 Neshanic Cemetery, Neshanic 
 New Somerville Cemetery, Somerville 
 North Branch Reformed Church Cemetery, North Branch 
 North Plainfield Township Burying Ground (see Brook Avenue Presbyterian Cemetery, above)
 Old Dutch Parsonage, Somerville
 Old Presbyterian Graveyard, Bound Brook 
 Old Raritan Cemetery (see Old Somerville Cemetery, below) 
 Old Somerville Cemetery, Somerville
 Oppie Burying Ground, Rocky Hill
 Peapack Reform Cemetery, Peapack
 Peapack Union Cemetery, Gladstone
 Pleasant Plains Cemetery, Franklin Township 
 Pluckemin Cemetery, Pluckemin
 Pluckemin Presbyterian Church New Cemetery, Pluckemin 
 Pottersville Reform Cemetery, Pottersville 
 Prince Rogers Cemetery, Martinsville
 Raritan Cemetery, Somerville
 Rocky Hill Cemetery, Rocky Hill
 Sacred Ground Upper Cemetery, Skillman
 Sacred Ground Lower Cemetery, Skillman
 Sacred Heart Cemetery, Manville
 Saint Andrew Ukrainian Orthodox Cemetery, South Bound Brook
 Saint Bernard's Cemetery, Bernardsville
 Saint Joseph Cemetery, Bound Brook
 Saint Mary's Cemetery, Watchung
 Saints Peter and Paul Cemetery, Hillsborough
 Saums Burying Ground, Hillsborough 
 Shalom Cemetery
 Skillman-Beekman Cemetery (see Beekman Cemetery, above)
 Smalley Farm Burial Ground (see Symen Van Wickle Cemetery, below)
 Somerset Hills Memorial Park, Basking Ridge
 Somerville Cemetery, Somerville
 Somerville New Cemetery, Somerville
 Somerville Old Cemetery, Somerville
 South Branch Reformed Church Cemetery, South Branch
 South Middlebush Cemetery, Franklin Township
 Springdale United Methodist Church Cemetery, Warren 
 Stout-Shepherd Burial Ground, Stoutsburg 
 Swan Cemetery, North Branch
 Symen Van Wickle Cemetery, Somerset
 Temple Shalom Cemetery, Chimney Rock
 Ten Mile Run Cemetery, Little Rocky Hill, Franklin Township
 Trinity United Church Cemetery, Warren 
 Tucker Family Burying Ground, Warren
 Tunison Burial Ground (see Early Settlers Burial Ground, above)
 Tunison Cemetery, Somerville
 Unionville Cemetery, Montgomery
 Van Nest – Weston Burying Ground, Hillsborough
 Van Pelt Burial Ground, North Branch 
 Van Vegthen-Davis Cemetery, Finderne
 Vanderveer Cemetery #01, North Branch 
 Vanderveer Cemetery #02, North Branch 
 Veghte Burying Ground, Raritan
 Vermeule Family Burial Ground, North Plainfield
 Voorhees-Nevius Burying Ground, Franklin Township

Sussex County
Deckertown-Union Cemetery, Wantage
Harmony Hill Methodist Cemetery, Stillwater
Lafayette Cemetery, Lafayette
Newton Cemetery, Newton
North Church Cemetery, Hardyston Township
Stillwater Cemetery, Stillwater

Union County
Evergreen Cemetery, Hillside
Fairview Cemetery (Westfield, New Jersey)
Hillside Cemetery, Scotch Plains
Hollywood Memorial Park and Cemetery, Union
St. John's Episcopal Churchyard, Elizabeth
Gods Acre Cemetery, Scotch Plains Presbyterian Church, Scotch Plains
Rahway Cemetery
Rosedale Cemetery, Linden
Rosehill Cemetery and Crematory, Linden
First Presbyterian Churchyard, Elizabeth

Warren County
Belvidere Cemetery, Belvidere
Cedar Ridge Cemetery, Blairstown
Greenwich Presbyterian Church Cemetery, Greenwich Township
The Olde Presbyterian Burial Ground, Hackettstown

References

Cemeteries
New Jersey